Liptena septistrigata, the seven-striped liptena, is a butterfly in the family Lycaenidae. It is found in Guinea, Sierra Leone, Ivory Coast, Ghana, Togo, southern Nigeria and western Cameroon. The habitat consists of forests.

References

Butterflies described in 1903
Liptena
Butterflies of Africa
Taxa named by George Thomas Bethune-Baker